Mark Sheinkman (born 1963) is an American contemporary artist. His primary media are oil painting, drawing, and printmaking.

Sheinkman was born in New York City, where he currently lives and works. He received his Bachelor of Arts degree from Princeton University summa cum laude in art history and studio art in 1985.

Sheinkman's artwork has been written about and reproduced in Art in America, Artnews, The New York Times, The New Yorker, TimeOut New York, The Boston Globe, The Los Angeles Times, The Philadelphia Inquirer, El Pais, Il Mattino, Die Welt and many other publications

His artworks are currently handled by Von Lintel Gallery in Los Angeles, Steven Zevitas Gallery in Boston and Pace Prints in New York.

Art in public collections
Museum of Modern Art, New York City
Metropolitan Museum of Art, New York City
Whitney Museum of American Art, New York City
National Gallery of Art, Washington, D.C.
The Art Institute of Chicago, Chicago
Museum of Fine Arts, Houston, Texas
Cleveland Museum of Art, Cleveland, Ohio
Fogg Art Museum, Harvard University, Cambridge, Massachusetts
Yale University Art Gallery, New Haven, Connecticut
Weatherspoon Art Museum, Greensboro, North Carolina
Hood Museum of Art, Dartmouth College, Hanover, New Hampshire
Ackland Art Museum, Chapel Hill, North Carolina
Grand Rapids Art Museum, Grand Rapids, Michigan
Davison Art Center, Wesleyan University, Middletown, Connecticut
Ackland Art Museum, Chapel Hill, North Carolina
Allen Memorial Art Museum, Oberlin College, Oberlin, Ohio
Palmer Museum of Art, Pennsylvania State University, University Park, Pennsylvania
Achenbach Foundation for Graphic Arts, Fine Arts Museums of San Francisco
Chazen Museum of Art, University of Wisconsin, Madison, Wisconsin.
Sheldon Memorial Art Gallery, University of Nebraska, Lincoln, Nebraska
Figge Art Museum, Davenport, Iowa
St. Louis University Museum of Art, St. Louis, Missouri
The Texas State Galleries, Texas State University, San Marcos, Texas
Hite Art Institute, University of Louisville, Louisville, Kentucky
The Old Jail Art Center, Albany, Texas
Kupferstichkabinett Berlin, Museum of Prints and Drawings, State Museum of Berlin
Museum gegenstandsfreier Kunst, Otterndorf, Germany
Bibliothèque Nationale, Paris, France

Solo exhibitions 

2022: Von Lintel Gallery, Los Angeles
2021: 499 Park Avenue, New York
2020: Gallery Joe, Philadelphia
2019: Von Lintel Gallery, Los Angeles
2019: Lennon Weinberg Gallery, New York. (catalog)
2018: Von Lintel Gallery, Los Angeles
2018:  Steven Zevitas Gallery, Boston
2017: Lennon Weinberg Gallery, New York. (catalog)
2016: Von Lintel Gallery, Los Angeles
2015: Space 2B, Madrid
2015: Steven Zevitas Gallery, Boston
2014: Von Lintel Gallery, Los Angeles
2011: Von Lintel Gallery, New York
2010: Steven Zevitas Gallery, Boston
2010: Holly Johnson Gallery, Dallas
2009: Museum Gegendstandsfreier Kunst, Otterndorf, Germany (catalog)
2009: Von Lintel Gallery, New York
2008: Grand Rapids Art Museum, Grand Rapids, Michigan
2008: Fruehsorge Contemporary Drawings, Berlin
2007: Von Lintel Gallery, New York (catalog)
2007: Gallery Joe, Philadelphia
2006: Von Lintel Gallery, New York
2005: Kemper Museum of Contemporary Art, Kansas City, Missouri
2005: Fruehsorge Galerie, Berlin
2005: Gallery Sora, Naha, Japan
2005: osp Gallery, Boston
2004: Von Lintel Gallery, New York
2003: Gallery Sora, Naha, Japan
2002: Von Lintel Gallery, New York
2001: Von Lintel & Nusser, New York
2000: Lannan Foundation, Santa Fe, New Mexico
1999: Galerie von Lintel & Nusser, Munich, Germany
1998: Thomas Healy Gallery, New York
1998: S65 Gallery, Aalst, Belgium
1997: Galerie Thomas von Lintel Munich, Germany
1997: Berggruen and Zevi, London
1997: Studio Trisorio, Naples
1997: Lawing Gallery, Houston
1996: Morris-Healy Gallery, New York
1995: Gina Fiore Salon, New York
1993: Information Gallery, New York
1989: Paula Allen Gallery, New York

Selected group museum exhibitions 

2020–23: Line into Space, Museum of Fine Arts Houston
2020: Groß- nicht artig!, Museum gegenstandsfreier Kunst, Otterndorf, Germany
2017: Contemporary Masterpieces from Northwest German Public Collections, Kunstmuseum Bremerhaven, Bremerhaven, Germany
2016: Dot, Dash, Dissolve: Drawn from the JoAnn Gonzalez Hickey Collection, Pennsylvania Academy of the Fine Arts, Philadelphia
2015: Line: Making the Mark, Museum of Fine Arts, Houston
2013: Approaching Infinity: The Richard N. Green Collection of Contemporary Abstraction. Crocker Art Museum, Sacramento, California
2011: 100 Years/100 Works of Art, Grand Rapids Art Museum, Grand Rapids, Michigan (catalogue)
2011: Drawn/Taped/Burned: Abstraction on Paper, Katonah Museum of Art, Katonah, New York
2010: The Esprit of Gestures: Hans Hartung, Informel and Its Impact, Kupferstichkabinett Berlin (National Collection of Drawings and Prints), Berlin
2009: New York/New Drawings, 1946–2007, Museo de Arte Contemporaneo Esteban Vicente, Segovia, Spain (catalogue)
2008: Modern and Contemporary Art from the AMAM Collection, Allen Memorial Art Museum, Oberlin College, Oberlin, Ohio
2008: Drawings from the Permanent Collection, Figge Art Museum, Davenport, Iowa
2007: Leaded: The Materiality and Metamorphosis of Graphite, University of Richmond Museum, Richmond, Virginia; Traveled to other museums including Palmer Museum of Art, The Pennsylvania State University, University Park, Pennsylvania  (catalogue)
2006: "On Line", University Art Gallery, Sonoma State University, Rohnert Park, Californiak
2004: "Moving Outlines", Contemporary Museum Baltimore, Baltimore, Maryland
2003: "Recent Acquisitions: Works on Paper", Metropolitan Museum of Art, New York
2002:"Eye in the Sky: Visions of Contemporary Art from the Ackland Collection", Ackland Art Museum, Chapel Hill, North Carolina
2000: "A Decade of Collecting: Recent Acquisitions of Prints and Drawings 1990–2000." Fogg Art Museum, Harvard University, Cambridge, Massachusetts
2000: "Drawing is Another Kind of Language: Recent American Drawings from a New York Private Collection, Lyman Allyn Art Museum, New London, Connecticut, Mary and Leigh Block Museum of Art, Northwestern University, Evanston, Illinois, Honolulu Museum of Art Spalding House (formerly known as The Contemporary Art Museum, Honolulu), Hawaii
1998: "Large-scale Drawings from the Collection of Wynn Kramarsky", Aldrich Contemporary Art Museum, Ridgefield, Connecticut
1998: "Art on Paper", Weatherspoon Art Museum, Greensboro, North Carolina
1997: A Decade of Collecting: Recent Acquisitions of Prints and Drawings 1990–2000, Fogg Art Museum, Harvard University, Cambridge, Massachusetts
1997:Drawing is Another Kind of Language: Recent American Drawings from a New York Private Collection, Arthur M. Sackler Museum, Harvard University, Cambridge, Massachusetts; Traveled to other museums (catalogue)

References

Further reading
Melrod, George. "Mark Sheinkman: The Allusive Eloquence of Lines in Space, Exhibition catalog, May, 2020
McQuaid, Cate. “Delicate Balance.” The Boston Globe, April 29, 2015 
100 Years/100 Works of Art : Introduction to the Collection of the Grand Rapids Art Museum.
Schick, Dr. Ulrike, "When Drawing Becomes Painting While Representing the Ephemeral", Museum Gegendstandfreier Kunst catalog, 2009 
Cash, Stephanie, "Mark Sheinkman at Von Lintel", Art in America, March 2008 
Amy, Michael, "Mark Sheinkman: Drawing with Light", Exhibition catalog, 2007 
Edelman, Robert, "Mark Sheinkman: Between Gesture and Void", Kemper Museum Catalog, January, 2005 
Amy, Michael, "Mark Sheinkman at Thomas Healy", Art in America, December 1998 
Turner, Grady T., "Up Now, Mark Sheinkman", ARTnews, April, 1998 
"Goings On About Town", The New Yorker, April 20, 1998 
Landi, Ann, "On the Edge, Mark Sheinkman, The Eraser", ARTnews, September 1997 
Brennan, Michael,  Artnet, Autumn 1996

External links
Mark Sheinkman's web site
Sheinkman's works on ArtNet

1963 births
Living people
American draughtsmen
20th-century American painters
American male painters
21st-century American painters
Artists from New York (state)
20th-century American printmakers
20th-century American male artists